The following is a list of ecoregions in Laos as identified by the World Wide Fund for Nature (WWF).

Terrestrial ecoregions
Laos is in the Indomalayan realm. Ecoregions are sorted by biome.

Tropical and subtropical moist broadleaf forests
Luang Prabang montane rain forests
Northern Annamites rain forests
Northern Indochina subtropical moist forests
Northern Khorat Plateau moist deciduous forests
Northern Thailand-Laos moist deciduous forests
Northern Vietnam lowland rain forests
Southern Annamites montane rain forests

Tropical and subtropical dry broadleaf forests
 Central Indochina dry forests
 Southeastern Indochina dry evergreen forests

Freshwater ecoregions
The freshwater ecoregions of Laos include:
 Mekong

References

 Wikramanayake, Eric; Eric Dinerstein; Colby J. Loucks; et al. (2002). Terrestrial Ecoregions of the Indo-Pacific: a Conservation Assessment. Washington, DC: Island Press

 
Laos
ecoregions